Ana Rosalinda García Carías (born 21 September 1968) is a Honduran lawyer who served as First Lady of Honduras from 2014 to 2022, as the wife of President Juan Orlando Hernández.

Biography

Ana García Carías was born on 21 September 1968 in Tegucigalpa. She is the second daughter of the upper middle class marriage between José Guillermo García and Carlota Carías. Her siblings are Julia, Lottie, and Guillermo. During her childhood she lived in Juticalpa, Olancho – her father's birthplace – and then returned to Tegucigalpa.

At age 16 she graduated from the Sacred Heart Institute of Tegucigalpa. She studied at the Universidad Nacional Autónoma de Honduras, and graduated in 1991 with a degree in legal and social sciences with a focus in commercial law. She completed a postgraduate degree in public administration at the University of Albany in 1995. In 2002 she appeared before 15 magistrates to take her exam as a lawyer and notary, and was approved unanimously.

On 3 February 1990, she married Juan Orlando Hernández. This union has produced three children: Juan Orlando, Ana Daniela, and Isabela. Hernández has one daughter, Ivonne, from a previous relationship.

García Carías is a descendant on the maternal side of Doctor and General Tiburcio Carías Andino, who was constitutional president of Honduras for the National Party from 1932 to 1936, and then remained in power through a dictatorial regime from 1936 to 1949 with the backing of the United States.

Political career
Ana García Carías became First Lady of Honduras on 27 January 2014, following her husband Juan Orlando Hernández's victory in the presidential election on 24 November 2013. He defeated Xiomara Castro of the Liberty and Refoundation Party (who disputed the results), Mauricio Villeda of the Liberal Party, and Salvador Nasralla of the Anti-Corruption Party.

References

External links

 
 Official biography

1968 births
First ladies of Honduras
Honduran women lawyers
Living people
Notaries
People from Tegucigalpa
Universidad Nacional Autónoma de Honduras alumni
University at Albany, SUNY alumni
21st-century Honduran lawyers